Rhynchina is a genus of moths of the family Erebidae, that was formerly placed in the Noctuidae. The genus was erected by Achille Guenée in 1854.

Species
Rhynchina albidula Warren, 1913 Kashmir
Rhynchina albiluna Hampson, 1902 Sikkim
Rhynchina albiscripta Hampson, 1916 Somalia
Rhynchina angustalis (Warren, 1888) India
Rhynchina aroa Bethune-Baker, 1908 New Guinea
Rhynchina buchanani Rothschild, 1921 Niger
Rhynchina canariensis Pinker, 1962 Canary Islands
Rhynchina canestriata Hacker, 2004
Rhynchina columbaris (Butler, 1889) Dharmsala
Rhynchina comias Meyrick, 1902 New Guinea
Rhynchina coniodes Vari, 1962 South Africa
Rhynchina cramboides (Butler, 1879) Japan
Rhynchina crassisquamata Hampson, 1910 Rhodesia
Rhynchina deflexa (Saalmüller, 1891)
Rhynchina desquammata Strand, 1920 Formosa
Rhynchina endoleuca Hampson, 1916
Rhynchina equalisella (Walker, 1863)
Rhynchina ethiopica Hacker, 2011
Rhynchina ferreipars Hampson, 1907 Ichang, India (Mumbai)
Rhynchina herbuloti Viette, 1965 Madagascar
Rhynchina innotata Warren, 1913 Kashmir
Rhynchina inornata (Butler, 1886) Australia
Rhynchina leucodonia Hampson, 1912 Madras
Rhynchina leucodonta Hampson, 1910 Rhodesia
Rhynchina lithinata Wileman & West, 1930 Philippines
Rhynchina martonhreblayi Lödl, 1999
Rhynchina obliqualis (Kollar, 1844)
Rhynchina paliscia Bethune-Baker, 1911 Nigeria
Rhynchina pallidinota Hampson, 1907 Sikkim
Rhynchina perangulata Hampson, 1916 Somalia
Rhynchina pervulgaris C. Swinhoe, 1885 India (Poona, Bombay, Mhow)
Rhynchina pionealis Guenée, 1854 Dharmsala
Rhynchina plusioides Butler, 1889 Dharmsala
Rhynchina poecilopa Vari, 1962 South Africa
Rhynchina poliopera Hampson, 1902
Rhynchina reniferalis (Guenée, 1854) South Africa
Rhynchina revolutalis (Zeller, 1852)
Rhynchina sagittalis (Rebel, 1948)
Rhynchina sahariensis Rothschild, 1921 Niger
Rhynchina striga (Felder & Rogenhofer, 1874) Himalaya
Rhynchina talhamica Wiltshire, 1982 Arabia, Kenya
Rhynchina taruensis Butler, 1898 Kenya
Rhynchina tenuipalpis Hampson, 1891 Nilgiri
Rhynchina tinctalis (Zeller, 1852) Sierra Leone, South Africa
Rhynchina tripunctigera Berio, 1977 Formosa
Rhynchina yemenitica Hacker, 2011

References

Lödl, M. (1999). "Rhynchina martonhreblayi sp.n., eine bemerkenswerte neue Hypeninae aus Thailand (Insecta: Lepidoptera: Noctuidae)". Annalen des Naturhistorischen Museums in Wien. 101 (B): 349–353.
Lödl, M. (1994). "Zur Wiederauffindung der Type von Rhynchina obliqualis (Kollar, 1844) [Hypena] comb.n. im Naturhistorischen Museum in Wien, nebst Bemerkungen zur Synonymie (Inserta: Lepidoptera: Noctuidae)". Annalen des Naturhistorischen Museums in Wien. 96 (B): 369–372.

Hypeninae
Moth genera